Franco Gabriel Ibarra (born 28 April 2001) is an Argentine professional footballer who plays as a defensive midfielder for Major League Soccer club Atlanta United.

Club career

Argentinos Juniors
Ibarra arrived in Argentinos Juniors in 2010, aged nine. He would go on to make over one hundred competitive appearances in their youth system. Ibarra made his breakthrough into first-team football in December 2019, coming off the bench to replace Francis Mac Allister in a Primera División draw at home to Estudiantes. June 2020 saw Ibarra sign a new contract that would last until December 2024. His next appearance wouldn't arrive until 31 October 2020 against San Lorenzo, though the defensive midfielder would leave the match prematurely after receiving a red card; as he would again nine games later versus Boca Juniors; his final appearance.

Atlanta United
On 22 February 2021, Ibarra signed with Major League Soccer club Atlanta United.

International career
Ibarra represented Argentina's U18s at the 2019 COTIF Tournament.

Career statistics
.

Notes

References

External links

2001 births
Living people
People from Tigre, Buenos Aires
Argentine footballers
Argentina youth international footballers
Association football midfielders
Argentine expatriate footballers
Expatriate soccer players in the United States
Argentine expatriate sportspeople in the United States
Argentine Primera División players
Argentinos Juniors footballers
Atlanta United FC players
Major League Soccer players
Sportspeople from Buenos Aires Province